Cinclodes is a genus of passerine birds belonging to the ovenbird family Furnariidae. There are about a dozen species distributed across the southern and Andean regions of South America. They are terrestrial birds of open habitats, typically found near water such as mountain streams or the seashore where they forage for small invertebrates. They are stocky birds with strong legs and feet and pointed, slightly downcurved bills. The plumage is inconspicuous and mainly brown, often with a pale wingbar, stripe over the eye and corners to the tail. They have loud, trilling songs and often raise their wings while singing.

Taxonomy
The genus Cinclodes was introduced in 1840 by the English zoologist George Robert Gray. The name combines the Ancient Greek kinklos, a word for an unknown waterside bird, with -oidēs meaning "resembling". In 1855 Gray specified the type species as the dark-bellied cinclodes, a species that had been described in 1889 by Gmelin under the binomial name Motacilla patagonica.

The genus contains 15 species:

 Stout-billed cinclodes, Cinclodes excelsior
 Royal cinclodes, Cinclodes aricomae
 Buff-winged cinclodes, Cinclodes fuscus
 Chestnut-winged cinclodes, Cinclodes albidiventris (split from Cinclodes fuscus in 2012)
 Cream-winged cinclodes, Cinclodes albiventris (split from Cinclodes fuscus in 2012)
 Cordoba cinclodes or Comechingones cinclodes, Cinclodes comechingonus
 Long-tailed cinclodes, Cinclodes pabsti
 Grey-flanked cinclodes, Cinclodes oustaleti
 Olrog's cinclodes, Cinclodes olrogi
 Dark-bellied cinclodes, Cinclodes patagonicus
 Chilean seaside cinclodes or seaside cinclodes, Cinclodes nigrofumosus
 Peruvian seaside cinclodes or surf cinclodes, Cinclodes taczanowskii
 Blackish cinclodes, Cinclodes antarcticus
 White-winged cinclodes, Cinclodes atacamensis
 White-bellied cinclodes, Cinclodes palliatus

References

 Chesser, R. Terry (2004) Systematics, evolution and biogeography of the South American ovenbird genus Cinclodes, Auk 121 (3): 752-766
 Jaramillo, Alvaro; Burke, Peter & Beadle, David (2003) Field Guide to the Birds of Chile, Christopher Helm, London

 
Bird genera

Taxa named by George Robert Gray